Grevillea ramosissima, commonly known as fan grevillea, is a species of flowering plant in the family Proteaceae and is endemic to eastern continental Australia. It is a low, spreading shrub with lobed leaves and clusters of cream-coloured to pale yellow flowers.

Description
The edges of the leaves are turned down, and the lower surface is woolly-hairy.

Taxonomy
In 1830, Robert Brown described Anadenia caleyi in the supplement to his Prodromus Florae Novae Hollandiae et Insulae Van Diemen from specimens collected by George Caley in 1804. In 1855, Carl Meissner moved Anadenia caleyi to the genus Grevillea but the name Grevillea caleyi had already been used for a different species. Meissner changed the name to Grevillea ramosissima in Hooker's Journal of Botany and Kew Garden Miscellany. The specific epithet (ramosissima) means "much-branched".

In 1994, Peter M. Olde and Neil R. Marriott described G. ramosissima subsp. hypargyrea, and the name, and that of the autonym are accepted by the Australian Plant Census:
Grevillea ramosissima subsp. hypargyrea (F.Muell.) Olde & Marriott.
Grevillea ramosissima Meisn. subsp. ramosissima

Subspecies hypargyrea had previously been known as Grevillea ramosissima var. hypargyrea, first formally described in 1874 by Ferdinand von Mueller in his Fragmenta Phytographiae Australiae. It is distinguished from subsp. ramosissima by the straight hairs on the lower surface of the leaves.

Subspecies ramosissima is distinguished from subsp. hypargyrea by the twisted hairs on the lower surface of the leaves.

Distribution and habitat
Subspecies hypargyrea is endemic to Victoria, where it is found in a few isolated places near the upper Murray River in the far north of the state, growing in woodland on granite.

Subspecies ramosissima is endemic to New South Wales where it occurs on the coast, tablelands and slopes south from near Glen Innes and Tenterfield.

Conservation status 
Subspecies hypargyrea is listed as "endangered" under the Victorian Government Flora and Fauna Guarantee Act 1988.

References

External links
 The Australasian Virtual Herbarium (AVH) – Occurrence data for Grevillea ramosissima

ramosissima
Flora of the Australian Capital Territory
Flora of Victoria (Australia)
Flora of New South Wales
Proteales of Australia
Taxa named by Carl Meissner
Plants described in 1830